Caux-et-Sauzens is a commune in the Aude department in southern France.

Located 8 kilometres west of Carcassonne between the Montagne Noire and Malepère, at the crossroads of the old Roman roads to Toulouse and from Foix towards Ariège and Spain. The Canal du Midi runs between the Village of Caux and the Hamlet of Sauzens. Its inhabitants are known as Cauxois.

History
The hamlet of Sauzens and the village Caux joined to form Caux et Sauzens during the French revolution in 1791.

Population

See also
Communes of the Aude department

References

External links

 Official website 

Communes of Aude
Aude communes articles needing translation from French Wikipedia